6 Andromedae is an astrometric binary star system in the northern constellation of Andromeda. The designation comes from the star catalogue of John Flamsteed, first published in 1712. Its apparent visual magnitude is 5.91, which is just bright enough to be visible to the naked eye under good seeing conditions. Based upon an annual parallax shift of 34.1 mas as seen from Earth, it is around 96 light years from the Sun. It is moving closer to the Sun with a radial velocity of −32.4 km/s. The system has a relatively high proper motion, advancing across the celestial sphere at the rate of 0.272 arc seconds per annum.

This is a single-lined spectroscopic binary with an orbital period of 9.2 years and an eccentricity of 0.3.  Some early observations of the star gave it a subgiant luminosity class and it was published in the Bright Star Catalogue as spectral class F5 IV.  More modern measurements identify the visible component as an F-type main-sequence star with a stellar classification of F5 V.  The star is an estimated 2.9 billion years old with 1.3 times the mass of the Sun and 1.5 times the Sun's radius. It is radiating 3.1 times the Sun's luminosity from its photosphere at an effective temperature of around 6,425 K. 6 Andromedae displays an infrared excess at a wavelength of 22 μm, which may indicate a circumstellar disk of warm dusty debris.

The mass of the secondary component is roughly at or above that of the Sun. If it were a single, ordinary star, it should be readily visible as it would be just one magnitude fainter than the primary. The lack of conspicuous ultraviolet emission appears to rule out a white dwarf companion, so it may instead itself be a binary system consisting of two smaller stars having an orbital period between a week and a year.

References

F-type main-sequence stars
Astrometric binaries
High-proper-motion stars
Durchmusterung objects
Andromeda (constellation)
Andromedae, 06
218804
114430
8825